Countesswells is an area of Aberdeen, Scotland.

Construction 
In 2014, planning permission was granted for 3,000 homes in the area. However, the development was initially delayed after the developers and land owners could not agree on the funding for schools and infrastructure. In April 2016, Stewart Milne Group stated that it expected to start work on the development immediately. By November 2021, 900 homes were either completed or under construction.

Facilities 
An Aldi supermarket in the area opened in July 2022.

Transportation 
A bus route numbered 44, funded by the developers of Countesswells, began in 2019. It was operated by Stagecoach and ran half-hourly from Monday to Saturday between Countesswells and the park and ride at Kingswells. The route was withdrawn in 2020 during the COVID-19 pandemic and replaced with a twice-weekly shuttle service to a nearby supermarket.

In July 2022, service 15 was introduced by First Aberdeen. It runs from Countesswells to Balnagask via Aberdeen city centre.

References 

Areas of Aberdeen